Marianne Leonie Petrus Thyssen (born 24 July 1956) is a Belgian politician of the Christian Democratic and Flemish Party (CD&V) who served as European Commissioner for Employment, Social Affairs, Skills and Labour Mobility between 2014 and 2019.

Early life
Born in Sint-Gillis-Waas, to a Flemish family, not related to the family of Baron Thyssen, Thyssen graduated from the Catholic University of Leuven (KUL) in 1979, where she obtained a degree in law. She worked as a legal adviser for a Belgian organisation for the self-employed and small and medium-sized businesses UNIZO and the women's network Christelijke Middenstands- en Burgervrouwen (CMBV) now Markant, becoming Director then acting Secretary-General at UNIZO in 1991. From 1986-1988 she acted as legal adviser to the state secretary for public health and disability policy.

Political activity
From 1995-2008 she served as municipal Councillor for Oud-Heverlee, a municipality located in the Belgian province of Flemish Brabant, and in 2001 she became First Alderman for Oud-Heverlee. As a local councillor, she chose to work on such social issues as childcare and care for the elderly. In 2008 Thyssen was elected leader of CD&V party.

During her almost 23 years as a member of the European Parliament Thyssen was re-elected five times. She has sat on the European Parliament's Committee on the Internal Market and Consumer Protection, has substituted for the Committee on International Trade, was a member of the Delegation to the EU-Ukraine Parliamentary Cooperation Committee and a substitute for the Delegation to the EU-Turkey Joint Parliamentary Committee. From 1999-2014 she served as leader of the European People's Party's (EPP) Belgian delegation and from 2004-2009 was elected first vice-president of the EPP.

In 2014 Thyssen was appointed to the European Commission as Commissioner in charge of Employment, Social Affairs, Skills and Labour Mobility for the European Union (EU). She became the first Belgian woman to be appointed Commissioner.

Early career
 1979: Degree in law at the Catholic University of Leuven (KUL)
 Assistant in the faculty of law, Catholic University of Leuven
 Legal assistant in the office of the State Secretary for Health
 Successively legal adviser, head of a research department and acting Secretary-General at Unizo (organisation for the self-employed and small and medium-sized businesses)

Career
 since 1991: Member of the European Parliament
 Member of the bureau of the European People's Party
 Vice-Chairwoman of the EPP-ED Group's SME Circle
 First Deputy Mayor of Oud-Heverlee until 2008
 Chair woman of the CD&V (15 May 2008 – 23 June 2010)

See also
 2004 European Parliament election in Belgium

References

External links

 Personal Website
 
 

|-

|-

1956 births
Living people
Belgian European Commissioners
Belgian Roman Catholics
Christian Democratic and Flemish MEPs
Christian Democratic and Flemish politicians
KU Leuven alumni
MEPs for Belgium 1994–1999
MEPs for Belgium 2004–2009
MEPs for Belgium 2009–2014
MEPs for Belgium 2014–2019
20th-century women MEPs for Belgium
21st-century women MEPs for Belgium
People from Sint-Gillis-Waas
Recipients of the Civil Order of Alfonso X, the Wise
Women European Commissioners
European Commissioners 2014–2019